Charles Gordon Blazer (April 26, 1945 – July 12, 2017) was an American soccer administrator, who held a number of high level positions before becoming a government informant on widespread corruption within organized soccer and subsequently being banned by FIFA in 2015. He was a FIFA Executive Committee member from 1996 to 2013, the CONCACAF general secretary from 1990 to 2011, and executive vice president of the U.S. Soccer Federation.

In 2013, Blazer admitted to conspiring with other FIFA executive committee members to accept bribes in conjunction with the failed bid of Morocco and the successful bid of South Africa to become World Cup hosts in 1998 and 2010, respectively. His admissions came during testimony given at a sealed sentencing proceeding in a New York federal court.

Early life
Blazer grew up in a middle-class New York City Jewish family in the borough of Queens, where his father ran a stationery and newspaper shop. He attended Forest Hills High School and then took an accountancy degree at New York University. After graduating, he enrolled at NYU's Stern School of Business but did not complete his MBA.  He then spent a number of years selling promotional and marketing items; a first success was supplying buttons for the Smiley craze in the 1970s. When his son started playing youth soccer in Westchester County, New York, in 1976, Blazer started coaching the team even though he had never played the game. He is remembered as a skillful and active administrator, more interested in organizing than coaching. He advanced in youth soccer administration up to the Eastern New York State Soccer Association.

Career
In 1984, persuading Pelé to campaign for him, he was elected to the United States Soccer Federation as executive vice president in charge of international competition. In the next two years the US men's soccer team played 19 matches, having played only two in the two years before Blazer's election.  While with U.S. soccer, Blazer played a central role in the decision to make the successful bid for the 1994 World Cup. Also during this time, the U.S. women's soccer team was formed. Blazer's position gave him a seat on the board of CONCACAF, where he met Jack Warner. In 1986, after failing to win re-election, he co-founded the American Soccer League, running it from his home. It lasted only two years, with Blazer being forced out by the owners who felt they had been kept in the dark about finances. He became president of the Miami Sharks, taking control of the finances, only to leave precipitously after five months in May 1989.

In 1989, Blazer convinced Jack Warner to run for CONCACAF president. Blazer managed Warner's successful campaign and was then appointed General Secretary. He was the General Secretary of CONCACAF from 1990 until 2011. He was a member of the FIFA Executive Committee from 1996 to April 2013, when Sunil Gulati was elected to replace him.

Corruption allegations and conviction

In May 2011, in response to allegations of bribery made by national representatives attending a May 10 meeting of the Caribbean Football Union (CFU), Blazer initiated an investigation of AFC President Mohammed bin Hammam and FIFA Vice President Jack Warner. The investigation was conducted by John P. Collins, former United States federal prosecutor and FIFA Legal Committee member. Its submission led to FIFA's May 29, 2011, suspension of Warner and Bin Hammam from all soccer activities, pending the outcome of FIFA's own investigation and procedures. Acting CONCACAF president Lisle Austin attempted to fire Blazer five days later, but the action was blocked by the CONCACAF executive committee. On June 15, 2011, Blazer was questioned by the FIFA Ethics Committee.

On August 14, 2011, journalist Andrew Jennings noted in the British newspaper The Independent that the FBI was examining documentary evidence revealing confidential soccer payments to offshore accounts operated by Blazer. Blazer began working undercover for the FBI in December 2011.

On April 19, 2013, Blazer and Jack Warner were accused of massive fraud during their years as CONCACAF executives. A forensic audit by the organization's Integrity Committee determined that both men had functioned without a written contract from 1998 until their respective departures, and that Blazer had received US$15 million in commissions for his services during that timeframe. An anonymous government source expected that an ongoing FBI investigation into Blazer's finances would be expanded significantly and joined by the IRS. In May 2013, Blazer was suspended for 90 days.

On November 1, 2014, it was reported (by the New York Daily News) that Blazer had been a confidential informant for the FBI and the IRS, and recorded key meetings between executives for FIFA and for the 2012 Summer Olympics. Blazer was compelled to inform for the FBI and IRS after they uncovered more than a decade of unpaid taxes on hidden, multimillion-dollar incomes. On May 27, 2015, several FIFA officials were arrested in Zurich, with Blazer having been a key cooperating witness in the investigation that led to the arrests. In exchange for his cooperation, Blazer agreed to plead guilty to charges that include racketeering, wire fraud, income tax evasion, and money laundering. Blazer died before being sentenced. The delay in sentencing was caused by the decisions of his co-defendants to go to trial.

On June 3, 2015, the transcript of a closed sentencing proceeding (which occurred in the U.S. District Court for the Eastern District of New York on November 25, 2013) was unsealed and made public. In his 2013 testimony, Blazer admitted to conspiring with other FIFA Executive Committee members to accept bribes in conjunction with the selection of 1998 and 2010 World Cup hosts. On July 9, 2015, Blazer received a lifetime ban from FIFA from all soccer-related activity.

Death
Blazer died on July 12, 2017, of colorectal cancer at a New Jersey hospital at the age of 72. At the time of his death, he also had coronary artery disease and diabetes.

References

External links

1945 births
2017 deaths
Association football executives
American people convicted of tax crimes
American whistleblowers
American white-collar criminals
People convicted of mail and wire fraud
People convicted of money laundering
People convicted of racketeering
People from Queens, New York
Jewish American sportspeople
FIFA officials
New York University alumni
Deaths from colorectal cancer
Deaths from cancer in New Jersey
Forest Hills High School (New York) alumni
21st-century American Jews